A destructive F2 tornado touched down in Brahmanbaria District, Bangladesh at 16:50 local time. The tornado ploughed through agricultural land, and into at least 25 villages within a span of 20 minutes. It destroyed over 1,700 homes and damaged hundreds more. At least 36 people were killed and 431 were injured; mainly due to poor building construction practices, leading to collapses and the lack of an early warning system.

Meteorological history
The tornado formed at 16:50 local time. According to local residents, at 17:00, rain and a hailstorm occurred. It traveled east of its starting point in Ramrail, and then changed direction to the southeast, before changing to an easternly direction and dissipating at Ahmedabad.

It passed over bodies of water and became a waterspout, sending volumes of water into the air. Fishes at a nearby pond were picked up and deposited across the area. The water level in the pond reportedly fell by a foot. Moving through a marsh, the tornado also deposited large amounts of clay across the field. Many houses were destroyed and trees uprooted during the event, while residents heard a "strange noise" for many minutes. Intense lightning activity was interpreted from reports of a red fiery glow in the sky.

There were no meteorological stations in the vicinity of the tornado, hence many scientific parameters cannot be determined. A  area was affected by strong tornadic winds, with a  area suffering extreme damage. It was reported that total damage and 90% of the recorded fatalities occurred in this area.

Impact
Between its 12-kilometer travel distance from Ramrail to Ahmedabad, the narrow but strong and deadly tornado also struck 20 other villages. The village of Dubla suffered the greatest damage, and widespread major damage also occurred in Fulbaria and Chinnari. At least 28,913 people lived in the affected area, or which, 8,615 were significantly affected. At least 38 deaths and 431 injuries were recorded. A government figure stated that 1,778 homes were completely destroyed while 744 were partially destroyed. Some 1,731 families across eight unions in Brahmanbaria were affected.

Numerous homes, most of which were small and of frail construction, were completely destroyed, though a few well-built structures sustained major damage as well. Debris was scattered in all directions, and homes that were hit ranged from lightweight metal shacks, to small masonry homes. Several people were killed after being picked up and thrown by the tornado, and two of the fatalities were a woman and her baby, tossed 250 yards from their home. The woman was pronounced dead while her child was transported to the Dhaka Medical College and Hospital, where she died later that evening. The body of another woman was found near a latrine, and three relatives of one survivor were among the fatalities. The partial collapse of a district jailhouse resulted in the death of a guard, but all the other occupants survived.

Several thousand trees were uprooted, snapped, or debarked by the tornado, while utility poles and lines suffered major damage. Some 1,300 livestock were killed by the tornado as well. Farm fields were scoured by the tornado, and over 1,200 acres of agricultural land used to grow rice and vegetables were either destroyed or damaged. Several hundred to thousand public facilities like tube wells and latrines were left unsuitable for use. One man was also fatally electrocuted on his rooftop while attempting to survey the damage.

Aftermath
About 100 people were immediately transported to medical centers for their injuries. The initial death toll was reported at 10. Displaced residents took refuge at school facilities while the local government established makeshift tents in the affected villages. The local government provided each surviving family with 15 kg of rice, corrugated sheet metal, as well as 9,000 Bangladeshi takas (Tk) within 20 hours of the disaster. Relatives of the dead were compensated Tk 20,000. Individuals whose homes were damaged were provided Tk 6,000 to rebuild, and Tk 5,000 was given to those who were injured.

Gallery

See also
Tornadoes of 2013

References

External links
Footage of the tornado on YouTube

Tornadoes in Bangladesh
Tornadoes of 2013
March 2013 events in Bangladesh
Brahmanbaria District
2013 in Bangladesh
2013 disasters in Bangladesh